The 1795 English cricket season was the 24th in which matches have been awarded retrospective first-class cricket status and the ninth after the foundation of the Marylebone Cricket Club. The season saw 19 first-class matches played in the country.

Matches 
A total of 19 first-class matches were played during the season. These included matches played by teams from Kent, Hampshire, Middlesex and Surrey as well as Oldfield Cricket Club from Berkshire which played the last of its matches given first-class status.

The season saw first-class matches played for the first time at Bowman's Lodge, where Hampshire teams twice played an England side, Dandelion Paddock, where Sir Horatio Mann's XI played three matches, and Penenden Heath, which saw Kent play and England XI in the only first-class match played on the ground. Windmill Down at Hambledon saw its final first-class match.

One match, played between teams organised by the Earl of Winchilsea and Richard Leigh began in July at Stoke Down, Alresford, began on 23 July, but play ended on the third day on 25 July with Leigh's team requiring another 36 runs for victory. Usually, teams would have aimed to complete matches as quickly as possible at a later date, and an extra day's play was scheduled for 17 August. This did not take place, and the match was ultimately completed on 28 June 1796, 340 days after it had started.

First mentions
Players who made their first-class debuts in 1795 include:
 William Barton
 Arthur Upton
 Charles Warren
 J Drew
 Hooker
 Frederic Reynolds

References

Further reading
 
 
 
 

1795 in English cricket
English cricket seasons in the 18th century